Rooks Heath School (formerly known as Rooks Heath High School,Rooks Heath College and before that Roxeth Senior School) is a state secondary school and Sixth Form, in South Harrow in the London Borough of Harrow. It is a mixed comprehensive school serving culturally and socially diverse community in South Harrow. Built on the grounds of a former hospital, 
the school has approximately 1000 pupils.

History
Roxeth Manor Secondary Modern School opened on the site in Eastcote Lane in the 1930s, next to the primary school. Additional buildings were added in the 1960s. The secondary school was renamed Rooks Heath in September 1974 when the London Borough of Harrow adopted the comprehensive system of education. The school gained specialist status as a Business and Enterprise College, before converting to academy status in August 2011.

References

External links
Official site

Secondary schools in the London Borough of Harrow
Academies in the London Borough of Harrow